A list of aircraft used by Italy during World War II until its capitulation to the Allies in September 1943. After that Italy was divided in two states, the Axis Italian Social Republic in the north and the Allied Italian kingdom in the south. Both countries had their own Air Force fitted with formerly used Italian aircraft and other nation's planes. Meanwhile, the Italian National Republican Air Force continued fighting against the Allies till the last months of 1945, and the Italian co-belligerant Air Force begun operation against the Nazi forces in the Balkans.
Aircraft marked in pink were captured, while aircraft in blue did not progress past prototypes.

Aircraft

Captured
Repainted in Italian markings. Primarily used for evaluation. Other aircraft were captured but were not flyable.
 Breguet 19 B.2 (1)
 Breguet 693 AB.2 (2+)
 Bristol Beaufighter Mk.IF (1)
 Bristol Blenheim Mk.IV
 Consolidated B-24D Liberator (1)
 Dornier Do 17Kb-1 (1)
 Fairey Albacore (1)
 Fairey Swordfish (1 – not flyable)
 Hawker Fury (4)
 Hawker Hurricane Mk.I (1)
 Lockheed P-38 Lightning (1)
 Rogožarski Fizir (3)
 Rogožarski PVT (1)
 Zmaj Fizir FP-2

References

Citations

Notes

Bibliography

Regia Aeronautica
Italian military-related lists
Regia Aeronautica